Seydəkəran (also, Seyidəkəran, Seydakeran, and Seyde-Karan) is a village and municipality in the Lankaran Rayon of Azerbaijan.  It has a population of 1,026.

References 

Populated places in Lankaran District